The Celebes rat (Taeromys celebensis) is a species of rodent in the family Muridae.
It is found only in Sulawesi, Indonesia.

References

Taeromys
Rodents of Sulawesi
Mammals described in 1867
Taxonomy articles created by Polbot